The Phenix Aviation Phenix is a Spanish autogyro, under development by Phenix Aviation of Alicante. The aircraft is intended to be supplied as a complete ready-to-fly-aircraft.

The project was first announced at the Aero 09 show held in Friedrichshafen, Germany in 2009. The first prototype flew in 2010, with the second prototype flying in 2011.

Design and development
The Phenix is constructed mostly from carbon fibre and of pod and boom layout. It features a single, two-bladed Wagtail or  diameter Averso main rotor with a chord of  mounted at the top of a tall column. It has a two-seats-in side-by-side configuration enclosed cockpit with forward hinged doors on both sides, tricycle landing gear and a four-cylinder, air and liquid-cooled, four-stroke, dual-ignition turbocharged  Rotax 914 engine in tractor configuration. The tractor layout provides better propeller efficiency and less noise, but at the cost of reduced forward cockpit visibility. Behind the seats is a separate baggage space, accessed externally from either side through its own doors.

The short rear fuselage carries a broad tailplane with octagonal endplate fins that have rudders mounted on them.  The first prototype had another central, ventral underfin with its own rudder. A ballistic parachute is installed in the tail cone.

The first Phenix flew on 11 December 2009, after being displayed at Aero '09 in Friedrichshafen in April that year. This first prototype was flown from the left hand seat but the second, first flown on 30 September 2011 adopted the standard helicopter right hand layout. The Phenix is designed to meet the  British BCAR-T standards.  Two versions are under development: the Ultralight, to meet European  regulations and the Experimental for South Africa.

Specifications (Phenix)

References

External links

2000s Spanish sport aircraft
Single-engined tractor autogyros